A bull roast is a meal where beef, typically not an entire bull, is roasted over an open pit barbecue and then sliced up and served. It is similar in concept to a pig roast. The meat at a bull roast is sometimes pit beef and is often accompanied by oysters.

While not technically exclusive to any one particular area, bull roasts are a common social function along the east coast of the United States, especially the Chesapeake Bay region, Southern Maryland, and Virginia.

Sources
 Where There's Smoke There's BBQ
 OLL 10th Annual Bull Roast

Beef dishes
Barbecue
Maryland cuisine
Southern Maryland
American meat dishes
Eating parties